William John or Will John may refer to:

 William John (Medal of Honor) (1844–1927), American Civil War soldier and Medal of Honor recipient
 William Goscombe John (1860–1952), Welsh sculptor
 Will John (politician) (William John, 1878–1955), Welsh Labour Party Member of Parliament for Rhondda West 1920–1955
 William M. John (1888⁠–1962), American writer
 Will John (born 1985), American soccer player

See also